51826 Kalpanachawla, provisional designation , is an Eoan asteroid in the outer region of the asteroid belt, approximately 7 kilometers in diameter. It was discovered on 19 July 2001, by astronomers of the Near-Earth Asteroid Tracking program at Palomar Observatory in California, United States. The asteroid was named for Indo-American astronaut and mission specialist Kalpana Chawla, who died in the Space Shuttle Columbia disaster.

Orbit and classification 

Kalpanachawla is a member the Eos family, the largest family in the outer asteroid belt consisting of nearly 10,000 asteroids. It orbits the Sun in the outer asteroid belt at a distance of 2.8–3.3 AU once every 5 years and 5 months (1,968 days; semi-major axis of 3.07 AU). Its orbit has an eccentricity of 0.09 and an inclination of 10° with respect to the ecliptic.

The body's observation arc begins with a precovery taken by Spacewatch at Kitt Peak Observatory in April 1994, more than 7 years prior to its official discovery observation at Palomar.

Physical characteristics 

The asteroid's spectral type is unknown. Members of the Eos family are typically K-type asteroids.

Diameter and albedo 

According to the survey carried out by the NEOWISE mission of NASA's Wide-field Infrared Survey Explorer, Kalpanachawla measures 6.947 kilometers in diameter and its surface has an albedo of 0.160.

Rotation period 

As of 2017, no rotational lightcurve of Kalpanachawla has been obtained from photometric observations. The asteroid's rotation period, poles and shape remain unknown.

Naming 

This minor planet was named after Indo-American astronaut and mission specialist Kalpana Chawla, who was killed in the Space Shuttle Columbia disaster on 1 February 2003. The approved naming citation was published by the Minor Planet Center on 6 August 2003. The following asteroids were also named in memory of the other six members of STS-107: 51823 Rickhusband, 51824 Mikeanderson, 51825 Davidbrown, 51827 Laurelclark, 51828 Ilanramon and 51829 Williemccool.

References

External links 
 NASA JPL - Space Shuttle Columbia Tribute page
 Asteroid Lightcurve Database (LCDB), query form (info )
 Dictionary of Minor Planet Names, Google books
 Asteroids and comets rotation curves, CdR – Observatoire de Genève, Raoul Behrend
 Discovery Circumstances: Numbered Minor Planets (50001)-(55000) – Minor Planet Center
 
 

051826
051826
Named minor planets
Kalpana Chawla
20010719